Quango or Qango may refer to:
Quango, an acronym meaning "quasi-autonomous non-governmental organisation"
Quango Music Group, a music label
Quando Quango, a Manchester, England-based new wave dance project
Qango (band), an English progressive rock band

See also
 Cuango (disambiguation)